David MacKenzie (born 27 March 1949) is an Australian Academic researcher. He is known for his research and development in policy contributions to homelessness, with a particular interest in young people. He is the founder of Youth Development Australia Limited, an NGO.

Early life and education 
MacKenzie was born in Sydney to John Franklin MacKenzie and Shirley June Mackenzie. He attended a State High School and with scholarships studied Chemical Engineering at Sydney University. He later completed Post graduate degrees in Education and Social science and after moving to Melbourne in 1975.

References 

Research in Australia
Educational researchers
Living people
1949 births